Karnyothrips is a genus of thrips in the family Phlaeothripidae.

Species
 Karnyothrips acer
 Karnyothrips alpha
 Karnyothrips americanus
 Karnyothrips antennalis
 Karnyothrips antennatus
 Karnyothrips anthracinus
 Karnyothrips arizona
 Karnyothrips ateuchis
 Karnyothrips brimleyi
 Karnyothrips bromelianus
 Karnyothrips caliginosus
 Karnyothrips cameroni
 Karnyothrips caxamarca
 Karnyothrips cyathomorphus
 Karnyothrips dodgei
 Karnyothrips duplicatus
 Karnyothrips expandosus
 Karnyothrips festivus
 Karnyothrips flavicornis
 Karnyothrips flavipes
 Karnyothrips franciscanus
 Karnyothrips harti
 Karnyothrips inflatus
 Karnyothrips insignis
 Karnyothrips longiceps
 Karnyothrips maurilia
 Karnyothrips medialis
 Karnyothrips melaleucus
 Karnyothrips merrilli
 Karnyothrips minimus
 Karnyothrips mucidus
 Karnyothrips nevadensis
 Karnyothrips nigriflavus
 Karnyothrips noveboracensis
 Karnyothrips ochropezus
 Karnyothrips pacificus
 Karnyothrips palmerae
 Karnyothrips piceus
 Karnyothrips politus
 Karnyothrips prolatus
 Karnyothrips rhopalocerus
 Karnyothrips robustus
 Karnyothrips sonorensis
 Karnyothrips spinulus
 Karnyothrips sympathicus
 Karnyothrips tepoztlanensis
 Karnyothrips texensis
 Karnyothrips venustus
 Karnyothrips yoshi

References

Phlaeothripidae
Thrips genera